Moritani (written: 守谷) is a Japanese surname. Notable people with the surname include:

, Japanese singer
, Japanese film director and screenwriter

See also
Mauritania, called Moritani in the Pulaar language

Japanese-language surnames